The 2005–06 season of the NOFV-Oberliga was the twelfth season of the league at tier four (IV) of the German football league system.

The NOFV-Oberliga was split into two divisions, NOFV-Oberliga Nord and NOFV-Oberliga Süd. The champions of each, 1. FC Union Berlin and 1. FC Magdeburg, were directly promoted to the 2006–07 Regionalliga Nord.

North

Top goalscorers

South

Top goalscorers

External links 
 NOFV-Online – official website of the North-East German Football Association 

NOFV-Oberliga seasons
4
Germ